Nikolaj Pešalov (born on May 30, 1970) is a Bulgarian-born Croatian Olympic and World former champion in weightlifting. 

During his long and successful career, Pešalov was World champion eight times in various categories and disciplines, and broke several world records. His Olympic medals are split between Bulgaria (1992 and 1996) and Croatia (2000 and 2004). In 2000 he was granted Croatian citizenship, and he now holds besides Bulgarian, a Croatian passport. He resides in both Sofia and Split.

Further achievements 
 Senior world champion (1990, 1993, 1994);
 Silver medalist in Senior World Championships (1989 and 1998);
 Bronze medalist in Senior World Championships (1995);
 Senior European champion (1991–1995, 1997, 2000, 2001);
 Silver medalist in Senior European Championships (1989, 1990, 2004);
 Set five world records during career.

Major results

Weightlifting career bests 
 Snatch: 150.0 kg in the class to 62 kg;
 Clean and jerk: 187.5 kg 2004 Summer Olympics in the class to 69 kg;
 Total: 312.5 kg (137.5 + 175.0) 1992 European Weightlifting Championships in the class to 60 kg;
 Total: 325.0 kg 2000 Summer Olympics in the class to 62 kg (Olympic record);
 Total: 337.5 kg 2004 Summer Olympics in the class to 69 kg.

World records

References 

 databaseOlympics 1992+1996
 databaseOlympics 2000+2004
 
 Nikolay Pechalov at Database Weightlifting

1970 births
Living people
Croatian male weightlifters
Bulgarian male weightlifters
Naturalized citizens of Croatia
Olympic weightlifters of Bulgaria
Olympic weightlifters of Croatia
Olympic bronze medalists for Bulgaria
Olympic silver medalists for Bulgaria
Olympic gold medalists for Croatia
Olympic bronze medalists for Croatia
Weightlifters at the 1992 Summer Olympics
Weightlifters at the 1996 Summer Olympics
Weightlifters at the 2000 Summer Olympics
Weightlifters at the 2004 Summer Olympics
Franjo Bučar Award winners
Olympic medalists in weightlifting
People from Pazardzhik Province
Croatian people of Bulgarian descent
European champions for Croatia
Medalists at the 2004 Summer Olympics
Medalists at the 2000 Summer Olympics
Medalists at the 1996 Summer Olympics
Medalists at the 1992 Summer Olympics
World record setters in weightlifting
European Weightlifting Championships medalists
World Weightlifting Championships medalists